Peter de Roo (born on 16 February 1970 in Amsterdam) is a retired footballer from the Netherlands. He played professional football for twelve years, mainly for BV Veendam and SC Cambuur from 1996 to 2002. After his playing career, de Roo became a coach and technical director in Dutch professional football at SC Cambuur. In 2009, de Roo further expanded on his football experiences by taking an offer to work in Australia as a technical director at Football Queensland. From 2012 to 2017, he was the Technical Director with the FFA Centre of Excellence (formerly known as the Australian Institute of Sport Football Program). In September 2017, de Roo was appointed by the Football Association of Malaysia as their new Technical Director. de Roo has resigned from his post as Technical Director on 2020. He is currently head coach at Balestier Khalsa in the Singapore Premier League

References 

1970 births
Living people
Dutch footballers
Dutch football managers
Dutch expatriates in Australia
SC Cambuur players
Footballers from Amsterdam
Association football midfielders